The Corgo line (Linha do Corgo) was a  railway line in northern Portugal. It closed in 2009. It ran north from Régua (a junction station on the main Douro railway line running along the Douro Valley) to Vila Real and Chaves. The line was latterly operated by Comboios de Portugal.

Early years
The section from Régua (also known as Peso da Régua) to Vila Real was  opened in 1906. The extension to Chaves was built in stages, but not completed until 1921. The distance from Regua to Chaves was 97 kilometres. The first short section of track north from Regua was dual gauged (including a large metal girder bridge over the Corgo River), shared with the main Iberian gauge Douro railway line.

In its early years the line was operated by the CF do Estado (State Railways). Following privatisation of the CF do Estado in 1928, the line came under the Companhia Nacional (CN) until taken over by the CP in 1947. CP introduced economy measures, such as diesel railcars and eventually diesel locomotives in place of steam traction (notably a small fleet of Mallet locomotives built by Henschel).

Final years and closure
The Corgo line was steam operated until the 1970s, with steam shunting engines continuing in limited use until the 1980s. The introduction of the Série 9000 and later the Série 9020 diesel locomotives replaced steam working on the line. In 1982 the line featured in an episode of the BBC television series Great Little Railways.

Due to road improvements and falling passenger numbers, the northern section of the line between Vila Real and Chaves was closed in 1990. 

On 25 March 2009 the remaining service on the line (between Regua and Vila Real) was suspended due to the condition of the track. Repairs were promised and the line was expected to reopen by 2011. In practice, due to budgetary constraints, the repairs have not been forthcoming and the replacement bus service was itself withdrawn with effect from 1 January 2012. The tracks were lifted from Vila Real station by 2011.

Other narrow gauge railways in the Douro Valley
Sabor line - closed 1988
Tâmega line - closed 2009
Tua line - closed 2018

See also 
 List of railway lines in Portugal
 List of Portuguese locomotives and railcars
 History of rail transport in Portugal

References

Railway lines in Portugal
Metre gauge railways in Portugal
Railway lines closed in 2009
Railway lines opened in 1906
1906 establishments in Portugal